The eighth season of the American sitcom The Big Bang Theory premiered on CBS with two back-to-back episodes on Monday, September 22, 2014. The series returned to its regular Thursday night time slot on October 30, 2014 beginning with the  eighth season's seventh episode. The season concluded on May 7, 2015. On March 12, 2014, The Big Bang Theory was renewed for an additional three years, extending it through the 2016–17 television season for a total of ten seasons.

Mayim Bialik submitted the episode "The Prom Equivalency" for consideration due to her nomination for the Primetime Emmy Award for Outstanding Supporting Actress in a Comedy Series at the 67th Primetime Emmy Awards. Christine Baranski submitted the episode "The Maternal Combustion" for consideration due to her nomination for the Primetime Emmy Award for Outstanding Guest Actress in a Comedy Series at the 67th Primetime Creative Arts Emmy Awards.

Carol Ann Susi, the voice of the never-seen Mrs. Wolowitz, died of cancer at age 62 on November 11, 2014.  In the season's fifteenth episode, "The Comic Book Store Regeneration", Howard Wolowitz receives a phone call that his mother  died while visiting family in Florida.

Production 
In February 2014, CBS CEO Leslie Moonves confirmed an eighth season, when announcing that the first part of the new season would air on a different night, due to CBS acquiring the rights to Thursday Night Football games. In May 2014, CBS announced at its annual upfront presentation, that the series would begin its eighth season on Mondays, before returning to the Thursday slot it has held since 2010 on October 30, once the football games end.

Delay 
Production for the season was expected to begin on July 30, 2014, however the start was delayed due to the five main cast members' desire to renegotiate new contracts, with Johnny Galecki, Jim Parsons and Kaley Cuoco seeking approximately $1 million per episode, as well as more backend money. Simon Helberg and Kunal Nayyar negotiated together, separate from Galecki, Parsons and Cuoco's negotiations. Production was officially delayed on July 30, due to the contract negotiations, and was rescheduled for August 6, 2014. On August 4, Galecki, Parsons and Cuoco signed new contracts, worth $1 million per episode for three years, with the possibility to extend for a fourth year. The deals also include larger pieces of the show, signing bonuses, production deals and advances towards the back-end. The following day, Helberg and Nayyar renegotiated their contracts, giving them a per-episode pay in the "mid six-figure range", up from around $100,000 per episode they each received in years prior. The first table read for season 8 took place on August 6.

Premiere 
The first episode of season 8, "The Locomotion Interruption", first aired in the US on September 22, 2014. In Australia, season 8 premiered on October 13, 2014. In the UK, "The Locomotion Interruption" first aired on October 23, 2014.

Cast

Main cast
 Johnny Galecki as Dr. Leonard Hofstadter
 Jim Parsons as Dr. Sheldon Cooper
 Kaley Cuoco as Penny
 Simon Helberg as Howard Wolowitz
 Kunal Nayyar as Dr. Rajesh "Raj" Koothrappali
 Mayim Bialik as Dr. Amy Farrah Fowler
 Melissa Rauch as Dr. Bernadette Rostenkowski-Wolowitz
 Kevin Sussman as Stuart Bloom

Special guest cast
 Billy Bob Thornton as Dr. Oliver Lorvis
 LeVar Burton as himself
 Nathan Fillion as himself
 Kevin Smith as himself (voiceover)

Recurring cast
 Carol Ann Susi as Mrs. Wolowitz
 Regina King as Janine Davis
 Michael Massimino as himself
 Laura Spencer as Emily Sweeney 
 John Ross Bowie as Dr. Barry Kripke
 Brian George as Dr. V.M. Koothrappali
 Alice Amter as Mrs. Koothrappali
 Wil Wheaton as himself
 Laurie Metcalf as Mary Cooper
 Christine Baranski as Dr. Beverly Hofstadter
 Stephen Hawking as himself

Guest cast
 Stephen Root as Dan
 Kara Luiz as Jeanie
 Paul Wilson as Professor Sharpe 
 Angela Relucio as Hostess
 Max Adler as The Zombie
 Tate Ellington as Mitchell
 Matt Bennett as Josh
 Sara Erikson as Gwen
 Kelli Goss as Chelsea

Episodes

Ratings

Reception 
The eighth season received positive reviews. MaryAnn Sleasman of TV.com praised character developments, and wrote that "there's a lot to be excited about with regard to this coming season" with some of the central characters more comfortable around each other.
Emily Gould of Salon criticized the humor, writing that "I watched all seven episodes that had aired so far this season and didn't so much as expel air forcefully from my nose in response to any of the jokes". Oliver Sava of The A.V. Club also criticized the humor, writing that "A lot of the jokes are tired and the plotlines are standard sitcom material, but if it's worked for seven seasons, why switch it up now?"

References 

General references

External links

2014 American television seasons
2015 American television seasons
The Big Bang Theory seasons